Lilaia is a village in the Phocis regional unit, in Central Greece. Until 1920 it was known as Kato Agoriani (Κάτω Αγόριανη), but was renamed after the nearby ancient city of Lilaea.

Transport

Road
The EO Livadias Lamias passes close by the village.

Rail
The Village is served by Lilaia railway station, with regional services between Athens and Leianokladi.  The station sees around 2 trains per-day.

See also
 Lilaea (ancient city)
 Frankish tower of Lilaia

References

External links

Populated places in Phocis
Mount Parnassus
Villages in Greece